Bouhier is a French surname. Notable people with the name include:
Jean Bouhier (jurist) (1673-1746), président à mortier to the Parlement de Bourgogne and writer
Jean Bouhier (bishop) (1666-1743), first bishop of Dijon
Claude Bouhier de Lantenay (1681-1755), second bishop of Dijon

French-language surnames